Jackson Township is one of the fifteen townships of Noble County, Ohio, United States.  The 2000 census found 536 people in the township, 496 of whom lived in the unincorporated portions of the township.

Geography
Located in the southwestern corner of the county, it borders the following townships:
Olive Township - north
Enoch Township - northeast corner
Jefferson Township - northeast, south of Enoch Township
Aurelius Township, Washington County - east
Salem Township, Washington County - southeast corner
Adams Township, Washington County - south
Waterford Township, Washington County - southwest corner
Center Township - west
Sharon Township - northwest

It is the most southerly township in Noble County.

A part of the small village of Dexter City is located in far northeastern Jackson Township.

Name and history
Jackson Township was originally called Olive Green Township, and under the latter name was organized in 1819 in territory then belonging to Morgan County.

It is one of thirty-seven Jackson Townships statewide.

Government
The township is governed by a three-member board of trustees, who are elected in November of odd-numbered years to a four-year term beginning on the following January 1. Two are elected in the year after the presidential election and one is elected in the year before it. There is also an elected township fiscal officer, who serves a four-year term beginning on April 1 of the year after the election, which is held in November of the year before the presidential election. Vacancies in the fiscal officership or on the board of trustees are filled by the remaining trustees.

References

External links
Noble County Chamber of Commerce 

Townships in Noble County, Ohio
Townships in Ohio